Live, Acoustic...and in Cinemascope! is a live album by the band Carbon Leaf that was released on their own label, Constant Ivy Music.

Track listing

References

2011 live albums
Carbon Leaf albums